Synuchus nanpingensis is a species of ground beetle in the subfamily Harpalinae. It was described by Kirschenhofer in 1997.

References

Synuchus
Beetles described in 1997